Bisnortilidine is an opioid metabolite. It is formed from tilidine by demethylation in the liver.

References

Human metabolites
Cyclohexenes